Planidia is a genus of beetles in the family Buprestidae, the jewel beetles. They are native to southern and eastern Africa.

Species include:

 Planidia elongulata Obenberger, 1922
 Planidia freudei Jelinek, 1971
 Planidia hauseri Obenberger, 1931
 Planidia vansoni Obenberger, 1936
 Planidia velutina Kerremans, 1899

References

Buprestidae genera
Beetles of Africa